Reflexive Entertainment was a video game developer based in Lake Forest, California. The company was cofounded by Lars Brubaker, Ernie Ramirez, James C. Smith and Ion Hardie in 1997. They developed nineteen games independently (for Microsoft Windows, Xbox 360 and Mac platforms), published two games, started distribution of downloadable casual games on their online Arcade, created a division of their Arcade entirely devoted to Mac games for Mac users and started hosting ad supported free online web browser games. In 2005, Reflexive's Wik and the Fable of Souls won three awards at the 2005 Independent Games Festival which included Innovation in Visual Art, Innovation in Game Design and the Seumas McNally Award For Independent Game Of The Year. In October 2008, Reflexive Entertainment was acquired by Amazon.com. On February 3, 2009, Amazon.com began hosting casual game content for internet download.

On March 31, 2010, Reflexive announced plans to stop selling games through its affiliate program in order to focus entirely on game development. In a letter sent to affiliates, CEO Brubaker stated that the program would continue its business as usual, which included web support and payment of referral fees on game sales until June 30.

Games
All games are developed and published by Reflexive Entertainment unless otherwise stated.

Awards
Ricochet Lost Worlds receives Best Action/Arcade game for 2004 award from RealNetworks

Wik and the Fable of Souls won three awards at the 2005 Independent Games Festival in San Francisco.
Wik also won the 2005 Academy of Interactive Arts and Sciences Award for Downloadable Game of the Year.

Awards:
 2005 Academy of Interactive Arts and Sciences
Downloadable Game of the Year!
 2005 IGF Downloadable Game of the Year!
(Seumas McNally Award)
 2005 IGF Innovation in Visual Arts
 2005 IGF Innovation in Game Design

Merger

Amazon.com acquired Reflexive Entertainment and as of 2014, it has been merged with the game development subsidiary, Amazon Game Studios, which was founded in 2012.

References

2008 mergers and acquisitions
Amazon (company) acquisitions
Video game publishers
Video game companies established in 1997
Video game companies disestablished in 2010
Defunct video game companies of the United States
Video game development companies